Bradford Woods is a borough in Allegheny County, Pennsylvania, United States. The population was 1,183 at the 2020 census. A suburb of the Pittsburgh metropolitan area, it is part of the North Allegheny School District and participates in the multi-municipality Northland Public Library.  It is home to Bradford Woods Elementary School.

History
Bradford Woods, originally settled as a summer getaway, was incorporated as a borough on May 3, 1915, from Marshall Township.  The Pittsburgh, Harmony, Butler and New Castle (Harmony Line) interurban railway previously ran through Bradford Woods, where Forest Road is today.  It provided a direct route to Pittsburgh.  A home rule government was established in 1974.

Geography

Surrounding neighborhoods
Bradford Woods has only two borders: Marshall Township to the north, south and west, and Pine Township to the east. The community is surrounded by unincorporated Wexford and has its own zip code.

Demographics

As of the census of 2000, there were 1,149 people, 464 households, and 373 families residing in the borough. The population density was 1,283.2 people per square mile (492.9/km2). There were 478 housing units at an average density of 533.8 per square mile (205.1/km2). The racial makeup of the borough was 98.61% White, 0.09% Native American, 0.87% Asian, 0.26% from other races, and 0.17% from two or more races. Hispanic or Latino of any race were 0.78% of the population.

There were 464 households, out of which 26.3% had children under the age of 18 living with them, 75.6% were married couples living together, 4.1% had a female householder with no husband present, and 19.4% were non-families. 17.5% of all households were made up of individuals, and 5.6% had someone living alone who was 65 years of age or older. The average household size was 2.48 and the average family size was 2.80.

In the borough the population was spread out, with 18.7% under the age of 18, 5.3% from 18 to 24, 21.1% from 25 to 44, 39.3% from 45 to 64, and 15.6% who were 65 years of age or older. The median age was 47 years. For every 100 females there were 97.8 males. For every 100 females age 18 and over, there were 95.4 males.

The median income for a household in the borough was $92,820, and the median income for a family was $100,329. Males had a median income of $70,313 versus $43,125 for females. The per capita income for the borough was $51,462. About 1.1% of families and 1.4% of the population were below the poverty line, including none of those under age 18 and 5.1% of those age 65 or over.

Government and politics
The local government of Bradford Woods occupies offices in Fithian Hall (the fire hall).  The current mayor is Doug Marsico.

Bradford Woods Borough serves its residents with a local fire company, No. 115.  The chief is Michael Slater and the President is Robert Farrell.  The fire hall is utilized for many different events, including the Couples Club plays and meetings, bingo nights, and the yearly spaghetti dinner.

Notable people
Christina Aguilera, Grammy award-winning singer, actress, and pop culture icon, grew up in Bradford Woods. In a 2002 episode of MTV Diary she returned to the area, and the owners of her former home on Bradford Road allowed her to tour her old house.
Chris Hoke, former Pro Bowl lineman for the Pittsburgh Steelers

References

External links
 Borough of Bradford Woods official website

Populated places established in 1915
Boroughs in Allegheny County, Pennsylvania